Indrehovdeholmen is an island lying  west of Langhovde-kita Point in the eastern part of Lützow-Holm Bay, Antarctica. It was mapped by Norwegian cartographers from air photos taken by the Lars Christensen Expedition, 1936–37, and named "Indrehovdeholmen" (the inner knoll island) because of its position among the islands adjacent to the Langhovde Hills.

References

Islands of Queen Maud Land
Prince Harald Coast